Alessandro Corti (born 21 June 2000) is an Italian professional footballer who plays as a forward for  club Olbia.

Club career
Formed on Giana Erminio youth system, Corti was loaned to Serie D club Villa Valle for the 2018–19 season. He made his debut with the first team and Serie C on 22 January 2020 against Renate.

On 20 July 2021, he renewed his contract with the club.

On 16 July 2022, Corti signed a two-year contract with Pergolettese.

On 30 January 2023, Corti moved to Olbia on a 1.5-year deal.

References

External links
 

2000 births
Living people
People from Sesto San Giovanni
Sportspeople from the Metropolitan City of Milan
Footballers from Lombardy
Italian footballers
Association football forwards
Serie C players
Serie D players
A.S. Giana Erminio players
U.S. Pergolettese 1932 players
Olbia Calcio 1905 players